SKH, or skh, may refer to:

 Savez komunista Hrvatske, the League of Communists of Croatia, Yugoslavia, 1932-1990
 Sheng Kung Hui, the Anglican Church in Hong Kong, China
 SKH, the abbreviation for Sengkang General Hospital, Singapore
 SKH, the IATA code for Surkhet Airport, Nepal
 skh, the ISO 639-3 code for the Sikule language, spoken on Simeulue Island, Indonesia
 SKH, the National Rail code for St Keyne Wishing Well Halt railway station, Cornwall, UK

See also